Jannik Stoffels (born 22 February 1997) is a German footballer who plays as a midfielder for FC Hennef 05.

References

1997 births
People from Neuwied (district)
Footballers from Rhineland-Palatinate
Living people
German footballers
Association football midfielders
SC Fortuna Köln players
Bonner SC players
FC Hennef 05 players
3. Liga players
Regionalliga players
Oberliga (football) players